Montenegro was represented by 2 athletes at the 2010 European Athletics Championships held in Barcelona, Spain.

Participants

Results

Women
Track and road events

Field events

References 
 Participants list (men)
 Participants list (women)

Nations at the 2010 European Athletics Championships
2010
European Athletics Championships